Ion Chicu (born 28 February 1972) is a Moldovan politician who served as Prime Minister of Moldova between 2019 until his resignation in 2020.

Biography

He was born on 28 February 1972 in the village of Pîrjolteni, located in the Moldovan Călărași District. He graduated from the Faculty of Management at the Academy of Economic Studies of Moldova. In 2005, he worked as director of the General Directorate of Structural Reforms of the Ministry of Economy and Trade. In the mid-late 2000s, he was the Deputy Minister of Finance of Moldova. From April 2008 to September 2009, he was the chief state adviser to Prime Minister Vasile Tarlev on economic issues and external relations. He also served as chairman of the Strategic Development Council of the Nicolae Testemițanu State University of Medicine and Pharmacy, worked as a consultant on public finance management in various projects. In January 2018, he was appointed Secretary General of the Ministry of Finance and in December of that year he became the Minister of Finance. He resigned from this post during the 2019 Moldovan constitutional crisis which brought down the Filip Cabinet.

He is married with three children.

After his term as Prime Minister ended, he subsequently founded his own political party in 2021, more specifically the Party of Development and Consolidation of Moldova, with a stated pro-European ideology. He failed to obtain any seats in the 11th legislature of the Moldovan Parliament after 11 July 2021.

Premiership (2019–2020)

On 14 November 2019, the government of Prime Minister Maia Sandu was defeated in a vote of no confidence after attempts to pass bills to change the judicial system. With the support of just over 60% of MPs, Chicu was approved as a replacement Prime Minister. The same day he announced that his government would "fulfill all obligations of the state to external partners and international financial organizations, primarily the International Monetary Fund and the World Bank". At the time of his appointment, he was described by President Igor Dodon as "a technocrat, a professional who has not been in any political party", although Chicu did serve as an advisor to President Dodon. The day after, he was introduced to a new Cabinet of Ministers by President Dodon, which included Victor Gaiciuc as defense minister and Pavel Voicu as interior minister. On 20 November, he went to Moscow on his first working visit, where he held talks with Prime Minister Dmitry Medvedev.

In May 2020, during a Facebook fight with Romanian MEP Siegfried Mureșan, he declared Romania to be the most corrupt country in Europe. Mureșan responded by criticizing the Moldovan government for not implementing reforms or fighting corruption. Chicu's words caused controversy in Romania. In fact, Moldovan-born Romanian deputy Constantin Codreanu requested the withdrawal of Chicu's Romanian citizenship. Other Romanian authorities also criticized his words. However, collaboration during the COVID-19 pandemic continued between the two countries. Chicu would later apologize during a meeting with the Romanian ambassador in Moldova Daniel Ioniță, reiterating his thanks to the country for its help to Moldova during the pandemic. He tested positive for COVID-19 on 9 December 2020.

Chicu and his government resigned as Prime Minister on 23 December 2020 amid protests demanding early parliamentary elections. He initially continued as acting prime minister but refused to stay on until a new government was formed, and was replaced by Aureliu Ciocoi on 31 December 2020.

Politics after premiership
On 31 March 2021, the Party of Development and Consolidation of Moldova was founded by Chicu; it was officially registered on 17 April of that year.

References

1972 births
Living people
People from Călărași District
21st-century Moldovan economists
21st-century Moldovan politicians
Moldovan Ministers of Finance
Prime Ministers of Moldova